The 2009–10 season Hertha BSC season began on 1 August 2009 with a DFB-Pokal match against Preußen Münster and ended on 8 May 2010, the last matchday of the Bundesliga, with a match against Bayern Munich. Hertha was eliminated in the second round of the DFB-Pokal by 1860 Munich, and in round of 32 in the Europa League by Benfica. The club finished in 18th and last place in the Bundesliga and was subsequently relegated.

Transfers

Summer transfers

In:

Out:

Winter transfers

In:

Out:

Goals and appearances

|}
Notes
 Kaká left Hertha during the winter break.
 Nemanja Pejčinović was on loan from Rad
 Cícero was on loan from Tombense.
 Roman Hubník joined Hertha during the winter break, and was on loan from FC Moscow.
 Bryan Arguez left Hertha during the winter break.
 Theofanis Gekas joined Hertha during the winter break, and was on loan from Bayer Leverkusen.
 Levan Kobiashvili joined Hertha during the winter break.
 César left Hertha during the winter break.

International appearances
Appearances from 1 July 2009 – 30 June 2010 are included.

Notes
 Match played before player joined Hertha.
 Player scored a goal in this game.
 World Cup match.

Matches

Friendlies

Notes
 André Ayew and Ivan Perišić were invited to train with Hertha during the summer break.

DFB-Pokal first round

Bundesliga day 1

Bundesliga day 2

Europa League Play-off round (1st Leg)

Bundesliga day 3

Europa League Play-off Round (2nd Leg)

Bundesliga day 4

Friendly

Notes
 Tim Scheffler was called up from Hertha's U-19 team for this game.

Bundesliga day 5

UEFA Europa League Group Phase Match 1

Bundesliga day 6

DFB-Pokal second round

Bundesliga day 7

UEFA Europa League Group Phase Match 2

Bundesliga day 8

Bundesliga day 9

UEFA Europa League Group Phase Match 3

Bundesliga day 10

Bundesliga day 11

UEFA Europa League Group Phase Match 4

Bundesliga day 12

Friendly

Notes
 Dennis Rommel was called up from Hertha BSC II for this game.

Bundesliga day 13

Bundesliga day 14

UEFA Europa League Group Phase Match 5

Bundesliga day 15

Bundesliga day 16

UEFA Europa League Group Phase Match 6

Bundesliga day 17

Friendlies

Bundesliga day 18

Bundesliga day 19

Bundesliga day 20

Bundesliga day 21

Bundesliga day 22

Europa League round of 32 (first leg)

Bundesliga day 23

Europa League round of 32 (second leg)

Bundesliag day 24

Bundesliga day 25

Bundesliga day 26

Bundesliga day 27

Bundesliga day 28

Bundesliga day 29

Bundesliga day 30

Bundesliga day 31

Bundesliga day 32

Bundesliga day 33

Bundesliga day 34

External links
Hertha's official webpage 
Bundesliga official webpage
DFB-Cup official webpage
UEFA Europa League official webpage

2009-10
German football clubs 2009–10 season